Óscar Gómez Barbero (born June 28, 1961 in Bilbao, Spain) is the corporate director of Information Systems at RENFE, the Spanish state railways. He has been charged with the implementation of a €156 million four-year ICT (information and communication technology) modernization process to conclude in 2010.

Previously Gómez Barbero was a partner at PwC-IBM and a general manager of the Basque publicly owned railway corporation Euskotren. He is a graduate of the Jesuit University of Deusto and holds an MBA from the same institution.

He is married and has three children.

References
Mr Gómez Barbero talks about RENFE's transformation at ESADE
RENFE Official Website
Wikipedia entry about RENFE

Spanish business executives
1961 births
Living people